Monovision (stylized MONOVISION) is the eighth studio album by Ray LaMontagne, released on June 26, 2020, via RCA Records. "Strong Enough" was released as the lead single.

Reception

The album received generally favorable reviews from critics. On Metacritic, which assigns a normalized rating out of 100 to reviews from mainstream publications, it has an average score of 80 based on six reviews.

Track listing

Personnel
 Ray LaMontagne – vocals, acoustic & electric guitars, harmonica, bass, drums, percussion, keyboards, engineering, production.

Charts

References

Monovision
Monovision
Monovision